Hydrolycus is a genus of large dogtooth characins from tropical South America, where found in the Amazon and Orinoco basins, as well as rivers of the Guianas. They have long, pointed teeth (shorter and less extreme in H. wallacei) used for spearing their prey, generally smaller fish. In a study of the stomachs of 45 individuals, most were empty, but among the remaining the prey fish were 15–50% of the length Hydrolycus itself.

In 1999 two new species were described, the first in this genus in 158 years.

Species

There are currently four described species.

 Hydrolycus armatus (Jardine, 1841) (Payara)
 Hydrolycus scomberoides (G. Cuvier, 1819) (Payara)
 Hydrolycus tatauaia Toledo-Piza, Menezes & dos Santos, 1999
 Hydrolycus wallacei Toledo-Piza, Menezes & dos Santos, 1999

References

Cynodontidae
Taxa named by Johannes Peter Müller
Taxa named by Franz Hermann Troschel
Freshwater fish of South America